Shamrock Bay is an Arctic waterway in Qikiqtaaluk Region, Nunavut, Canada. Located off northwestern Bathurst Island, the bay is on the south side of Sir William Parker Strait. Other bays in the area include Purcell Bay and Dampier Bay.

References

Bays of Qikiqtaaluk Region